Loop or LOOP may refer to:

Brands and enterprises
 Loop (mobile), a Bulgarian virtual network operator and co-founder of Loop Live
 Loop, clothing, a company founded by Carlos Vasquez in the 1990s and worn by Digable Planets
 Loop Mobile, an Indian mobile phone operator
 Loop, a reusable container program announced in 2019 by TerraCycle

Geography 
 Loop, Germany, a municipality in Schleswig-Holstein
 Loop (Texarkana), a roadway loop around Texarkana, Arkansas, United States
 Loop, Blair County, Pennsylvania, United States
 Loop, Indiana County, Pennsylvania, United States
 Loop, West Virginia, United States
 Loop 101, a semi-beltway of the Phoenix Metropolitan Area
 Loop 202, a semi-beltway of the Phoenix Metropolitan Area
 Loop 303, a semi-beltway of the Phoenix Metropolitan Area
 Chicago Loop, the downtown neighborhood of Chicago bounded by the elevated railway The Loop
 Loop Retail Historic District, a shopping district in the Chicago Loop
 Delmar Loop, an entertainment district in St. Louis, Missouri
 London Outer Orbital Path (LOOP), a signed walk around the edge of Outer London, England
 Louisiana Offshore Oil Port (LOOP), a deep-water port in the Gulf of Mexico off the coast of Louisiana

People
 Call Me Loop (born 1991), English singer and songwriter
 Liza Loop, American technology pioneer
 Uno Loop (1930–2021), Estonian singer, musician, athlete, actor, and educator

Arts, entertainment, and media

Film
 Loop (1991 film), a British romantic comedy
 Loop (1999 film), a Venezuelan film
 Loop (2020 film), an American animated short
 Film loop, the slack portion of the film around the projector lens in a movie projector
 Porn loop, an 8 or 16 mm video "short" of a pornographic nature that could be purchased from men's magazines starting in the 1950s

Music

Groups
 Loop (band), a London rock band

Other uses in music
 Loop (album), a 2002 album by Keller Williams
 Loop (music), a finite element of sound which is repeated by technical means
 "Loop" (song), a song by Maaya Sakamoto
 Loop, a 2020 mini-album by Peakboy

Other uses in arts, entertainment, and media
 Loop (novel), a novel in the Ring series by Koji Suzuki
 LOOP Barcelona, an annual meeting point for video art in Barcelona, Spain 
 Loop Mania, a mobile arcade video game

Computing and technology
 Loop (computing), a method of control flow in computer science
 LOOP (programming language), the pedagogical primitive recursive programming language with bounded loops
 Loop (telecommunication), sending a signal on a channel and receiving it back at the sending terminal
 Audio induction loop, an aid for the hard of hearing
 Local loop, the physical link in telephony that links the customer premises to the telephone company (telco)
 Loop device, a Unix device node that allows a file to be mounted as if it were a device
 LOOPS, the object system for Interlisp-D

Mathematics 
 Loop (algebra), a quasigroup with an identity element
 Loop (graph theory), an edge that begins and ends on the same vertex
 Loop (topology), a path that starts and ends at the same point, possibly reduced to a single point

Sports 
 Loop, a type of playboating maneuver
 Aerobatic loop, a type of aircraft aerobatic maneuver
 Loop (cricket), an aspect of bowling in cricket
 Loop jump, a figure skating jump
 Loop, a type of offensive shot in table tennis

Roller coasters
 Loop (roller coaster), a basic roller coaster inversion
 Pretzel loop, a roller coaster element

Transportation 
 Loop (Amtrak train), a discontinued Amtrak train
 The Loop (CTA), a rapid transit section bounding Chicago's Loop neighborhood
 Loop, underground public transportation system of The Boring Company in Tesla cars, including a proposed DC-to-Baltimore system
 Balloon loop, a section of track that allows reversal of direction without stopping
 Circle route, a public transport route that travels around and connecting the peripheral zones of an area.
 Loop line (railway), a branch line that deviates from a direct route and rejoins it at another location
 Loop route, a main route or highway that forms a closed loop
 Passing loop, a short section of track that allows trains to pass on a single track route
 Ring road or loop, a main route or highway that encircles a town or city
 Spiral (railway), a section of track that allows a train to climb a steep hill

Other uses 
 Loop (biochemistry), a flexible region in a protein's secondary structure
 Loop (education), the process of advancing an elementary school teacher with his or her class
 Loop (knot), one of the fundamental structures used to tie knots
 Loop, a cul de sac
 Loop, a type of fingerprint pattern

See also 
 
 The Loop (disambiguation)
 Loophole
 Looping (disambiguation)
 Loopy (disambiguation)
 Loupe, a small magnifying glass used by jewelers, watchmakers, and other precision craftsmen
 Circle
 Cycle (disambiguation)
 Cycle graph
 Electronic circuit
 Hoop (disambiguation)
 Inner loop (disambiguation)
 Line echo wave pattern (LEWP)
 
 Möbius strip
 Ring (disambiguation)